"Spiral" / "Ulterior Motive" is the first single by drum and bass band Pendulum. It was initially released on 10 July 2003, while the band were still based in Perth, as a promotional single by Kog Transmissions' sublabel Low Profile. The single was made publicly available on 1 March 2004 by Concord Dawn's label Uprising Records, with the same track listing as the promotional record. The record was released worldwide distributed by LOAD Media and is one of Uprising Records' highest selling singles.

Critical reception 
The single has received critical reviews. One review describes "Ulterior Motive" as "not a show-stopper, [it] could be worked into a few different sets, and comes across like a fun dancefloor tune", but also describes sections of "Spiral" as "an epic crowd pleaser".

Track listing 

12-inch vinyl promo

A. "Spiral" – 6:28
AA. "Ulterior Motive" – 6:10

12-inch vinyl single

A. "Spiral" – 6:28
AA. "Ulterior Motive" – 6:10

Personnel 
The following people contributed to "Spiral / Ulterior Motive".

Rob Swire – writer, producer, vocals, mixing
Gareth McGrillen – writer, producer
Paul Harding – writer, producer
Neil Devine – mastering

References

External links 
Spiral / Ulterior Motive at Discogs
Spiral / Ulterior Motive at MusicBrainz
Spiral / Ulterior Motive at SoundUnwound

2003 debut singles
Songs written by Rob Swire
Pendulum (drum and bass band) songs
2003 songs